Toshev, female form Tosheva, is a Bulgarian surname.

Notable people with this surname include:
 Andrey Toshev (1867-1944), Bulgarian prime minister
 Angela Tosheva (born 1961), Bulgarian musician
 Ivan Toshev (born 1992), Bulgarian footballer
 Martin Toshev (born 1990), Bulgarian footballer
 Ognyan Toshev (born 1940), Bulgarian cyclist
 Pere Toshev (1865-1912), Bulgarian revolutionary
 Slavcho Toshev (born 1980), Bulgarian footballer
 Stefan Toshev (1859-1924), Bulgarian general
 Todor Toshev (1919-1993), Bulgarian musician
 Yury Toshev (1907-1974), Bulgarian chess master

See also
General Toshevo, Bulgarian town named after Stefan Toshev

References

Bulgarian-language surnames